16 Lyncis is a star in the constellation Lynx. It is positioned next to the western constellation border with Auriga, and is also known as Psi10 Aurigae, which is Latinized from ψ10 Auriga. The star has a white hue and is visible to the naked eye with an apparent visual magnitude of 4.90. The distance to this object is approximately 241 light-years based on parallax, but it is drifting closer to the Sun with a radial velocity of −12 km/s. It has an absolute magnitude of 0.56.

This object is a solitary A-type main-sequence star with a stellar classification of A0Vn, a star that is currently fusing its core hydrogen. The 'n' suffix indicates "nebulous" absorption lines due to rapid rotation. It is around 181 million years old with a projected rotational velocity of 229 km/s.

16 Lyncis is suspected of being slightly variable, but this has not been confirmed. It was noted when 16 Lyncis was used as a comparison star for observing another variable, the peculiar HD 51418 (NY Aurigae).

See also
 Psi Aurigae

References

A-type main-sequence stars
Suspected variables
Lynx (constellation)
Aurigae, Psi10
Durchmusterung objects
Lyncis, 16
050973
033485
2585